was a Japanese daimyō of the late Edo period. He ruled the Mineyama Domain in Tango Province.

Early life
He was the son of Kuchiki Tanetsuna.

See also
 Kyōgoku clan

References

External links
 "Mineyama" at Edo 300  

1603 births
1665 deaths
Daimyo